United Nations Security Council resolution 647, adopted unanimously on 11 January 1990, after recalling Resolution 622 (1988) and a letter by the Secretary-General concerning the settlement of the situation in Afghanistan, the Council endorsed the letter's proposals regarding the United Nations Good Offices Mission in Afghanistan and Pakistan.

The Council then extended the mandate of the Mission for two months, until 15 March 1990, in accordance with the recommendations of the Secretary-General Javier Pérez de Cuéllar, and requested him to keep the Council updated on developments in the region.

See also
 Afghanistan–Pakistan relations
 List of United Nations Security Council Resolutions 601 to 700 (1987–1991)
 Soviet–Afghan War

References

External links
 
Text of the Resolution at undocs.org

 0647
Cold War military history of the Soviet Union
Afghanistan–Soviet Union relations
Political history of Afghanistan
1990 in the Soviet Union
Pakistan–Soviet Union relations
Afghanistan–Pakistan relations
 0647
 0647
Soviet–Afghan War
January 1990 events